Ngaio, a Māori word, may refer to various things related to New Zealand:

Ngaio (tree) Myoporum laetum, also known as the mousehole tree
Ngaio weevil (Anagotus stephenensis)
Ngaio, New Zealand, a suburb of Wellington, New Zealand
Ngaio Marsh (1895–1982), author and theatre director